Luis Felipe Echenique Wielandt (born 25 January 1972) is a Chilean sailor. He competed in the Laser event at the 1996 Summer Olympics.

References

External links
 
 Luis Echenique at NETVela

1972 births
Living people
Chilean male sailors (sport)
Olympic sailors of Chile
Sailors at the 1996 Summer Olympics – Laser
Laser class sailors
Laser Radial class sailors
Lightning class sailors
Optimist class sailors
Snipe class sailors
Sportspeople from Santiago
Sportspeople from São Paulo